Utz Brands, Inc. , more commonly known as Utz, is a large American snack food company  based in Hanover, Pennsylvania. The company produces a wide variety of potato chips, pretzels, and other snacks, with most of its products primarily sold under their family of brands. Utz is also a leading snack supplier to Warehouse Clubs and Mass Merchandisers nationwide.

History

Early years

Utz Brands began in 1921 as "Hanover Home Brand Potato Chips" when William and Salie Utz began making potato chips out of their home in Hanover, Pennsylvania, with an initial investment of $300. The hand-operated equipment used at the time produced approximately 50 pounds of potato chips per hour. Salie cooked the chips and Bill delivered them to local grocery stores and farmers’ markets in the Hanover, Pennsylvania and Baltimore, Maryland, areas.

Success soon allowed the couple to move operations to a small concrete building in the family's backyard. In 1938, production was boosted with the purchase of an automatic fryer capable of producing 300 pounds of chips per hour.

Post-war years and expansion

In 1938, Francis Xavier "F.X." Rice joined the Utz Company after marrying William and Salie's daughter Arlene Utz. Salie Utz died in 1965 and Bill died in 1968, at which time Rice became president of the company.

The company purchased two more Hanover-based production facilities during the 1970s. Rice retired in 1978, and his son Michael became company president, while Arlene Utz Rice remained as the company's chairman of the board. Utz's largest production facility and home of its current administrative headquarters was completed in 1983.

Modern era

In the late 1980s, sales of Utz pretzels began growing by 20 percent annually and, by 1991, pretzel sales comprised almost 10 percent of total revenue. In the summer of 1992, Utz added a third pretzel oven and began baking pretzels around the clock. By the middle of the decade, annual sales of Utz products topped $100 million and its employee base had reached 1,000.

In 1996, the company celebrated its 75th anniversary. By 1999, a new public website also allowed customers to purchase Utz products for at-home delivery. As the 21st century approached, Utz employed 1,300 with annual revenues exceeding $150 million. In 2004, sales reached $235 million annually, spurred in part by market expansion, a targeted advertising campaign in the New York City metropolitan region and a 2001 Consumer Reports taste test ranking Utz as the best tasting potato chip in the nation.

A 2010 plan to merge Utz with rival Snyder's of Hanover was blocked by the U.S. Federal Trade Commission.

In 2011 Utz Brands acquired Zappe Endeavors and its affiliated entities which manufacture and market Zapp's, Dirty's and California Chips brand potato chips. This acquisition included Zapp's plants in Louisiana, California, and Pennsylvania thereby making Utz a national snack food manufacturer overnight. Management of Zappe remained in place after the acquisition. In 2011 Utz Brands also acquired the Wachusett Potato Chip Company in Fitchburg, Massachusetts, enabling the production of the Utz brand in New England.

In 2012, Utz Brands acquired The Bachman Company with Utz buying the intellectual property rights, distribution and Ephrata manufacturing facility. The Bachman family would still use its Reading and Hyde Park Facilities under the name Savor Street Foods Inc. to make private label products and other goods for Utz. Utz Brands remained family-operated at that time, with Michael Rice as chairman and his son-in-law Dylan Lissette as chief executive officer.

In 2016, Utz Brands acquired snack food company Golden Flake.

In October 2017, Utz acquired Phoenix-based Inventure Foods, Inc. which manufactured specialty food brands including Boulder Canyon Foods, TGI Fridays and Vidalia.

In October 2019, Utz acquired rival snack food company Snyder of Berlin, Berlin, Pennsylvania (not to be confused with Snyder's of Hanover, with whom Utz had previously attempted to merge) from Pinnacle Foods.

In August 2020, Utz became a publicly traded company (ticker: UTZ) after combining with Collier Creek Holdings. In November 2020, Utz announced it would acquire Truco Enterprises for $480 million.

In January 2021, Utz announced it would acquire Vitner's for $25 million. In May 2021, Utz has acquired the supplier Fastida Foods for $41 million. In December 2021, Utz acquired R.W. Garcia for $56 million.

In January 2022, Utz acquired the distribution companies Clem Snacks and J&D Snacks. In February 2022, Utz bought a manufacturing plant from Evans Foods Group for $38.4 million.

Sponsorship

Until the 2012 season, Utz was a sponsor of the New York Yankees and had been part of the right field of Yankee Stadium for many seasons. They were also a sponsor for the Philadelphia Phillies.

Utz currently sponsors the Baltimore Orioles, and Pittsburgh Pirates.  Utz has sponsored the Philadelphia Eagles for many seasons. In addition, Utz is the official vendor of all pre-packaged snacks for the Baltimore Ravens starting in 2014. Also, Utz sponsors the Connecticut Tigers & Erie SeaWolves, of Minor League Baseball.

In 2018, the company signed a multi-year sponsorship deal with Major League Baseball to become the league's "official salty snack". The following year, Utz became the presenting sponsor of the 2019 National League Division Series.

Products

Utz also produces cheese curls, sunflower chips, tortilla chips, popcorn, pork rinds, and party mix. Specialty items include chocolate-covered pretzels, seasonal pretzel barrels and sports mixes. Utz also carries dips, salsas, and crackers.

In total, Utz makes 395 different types and flavors of snacks.

Utz regular potato chips are cooked in cottonseed oil; its Kettle Classic line in peanut oil; and its Grandma Utz varieties in lard. Additionally, Utz produces an organic product line, which includes products certified organic by Quality Assurance International, as well as a "natural" product line that includes, potato chips cooked in sunflower oil. The company incorporates the "Snacking Smart" icon on a number of its products, indicating a healthier snacking choice to the consumer.

Mail order and online store

In the mid-1980s, Utz started a catalog mail order service allowing consumers to order Utz products by phone for home delivery. In 1998, Utz added online ordering at their website utzsnacks.com.

Little Utz Girl mascot and logo

The official mascot of Utz Brands is the Little Utz Girl, or more commonly known as the Utz Girl.  She has appeared on Utz snack food packages and/or in the company logo since the 1920s. In the 1920s she was a realistic drawing of a young dark-haired girl with a bow, bob hairstyle, and blushing cheeks reaching into a bag of potato chips.  In the 1970s, the current cartoon drawing replaced the older one, with the "U" in the Utz wordmark doubling as the potato chip bag she is reaching into.  The logo changes colors according to what flavor of potato chips or variety of snacks it appears on, with the Utz Girl's hair being one color and her bow, blush, and shirt being another color as they always match.

See also 
 List of food companies

References

External links

 

Hanover, Pennsylvania
Brand name snack foods
Snack food manufacturers of the United States
Companies based in York County, Pennsylvania
Snack food manufacturers of Pennsylvania
Cuisine of Baltimore
American companies established in 1921
Food and drink companies established in 1921
Brand name potato chips and crisps
1921 establishments in Pennsylvania
Special-purpose acquisition companies
Companies listed on the New York Stock Exchange
2020 initial public offerings